Lothar Gans (born 17 February 1953) is a German former professional footballer who played as a defender.

References

1953 births
Living people
German footballers
Association football defenders
SV Meppen players
VfL Osnabrück players
2. Bundesliga players
VfL Osnabrück managers